Leliwa is a Polish coat of arms. It was used by several hundred szlachta families during the existence of the Kingdom of Poland and the Polish–Lithuanian Commonwealth, and remains in use today by many of the descendants of these families. There are several forms of the arms, all of which bear the name, Leliwa, but which may be distinguished as variations of the same arms by the addition of a Roman numeral. In 19th century during a pan South-Slavic Illyrian movement heraldic term Leliwa also entered Croatian heraldry as a name for the coat of arms considered to be the oldest known symbol; Bleu celeste, a mullet of six points Or surmounted above a crescent Argent – A golden six-pointed star (representing the morning star) over a silver crescent moon on a blue shield, but also as a name for all other coats of arms that have a crescent and a mullet.

Blazon
Original coat of arms of Leliwa, otherwise referred to as Leliwa I include Azure Shield (in Polish heraldry, this tincture is always sky blue), a crescent or, surmounted by a mullet of six points of the second, a Polish nobleman's helm, Crest out of a Polish nobleman's coronet, a fan of seven peacock's feathers proper, charged with the elements of the shield. Azure Mantling and or Motto Leliwa, signifying the battle cry, 'to the Liwa', of these proclamatio-arms.

Notable bearers and others
Bearers mostly resided in the regions Kraków, Poznań and Sandomierz of Poland, Wolyn and Podolia of Ukraine.

Families: Tarnowski family, Sieniawski family, Roycewicz family, Morsztyn family, Hlebowicz family, Czapski family, Tyszkiewicz family, Średziński families (Śrzedziński, Srzedziński, Sredziński), Sudnik family of Sudniki in the former Vilnius poviat (modern day Belarus).

Notable bearers of this coat of arms include: Henryk Leliwa-Roycewicz, Krzysztof Monwid Dorohstajski, Rafał Jarosławski, Jan Andrzej Morsztyn, Adam Sieniawski, Adam Mikołaj Sieniawski, Mikołaj Sieniawski, Mikołaj Hieronim Sieniawski, Konstanty Słotwinski, Jędrzej Śniadecki, Jan Tarnowski, Jan z Tarnowa, Ludwik Tyszkiewicz, Ludwik Skumin Tyszkiewicz, Jan Janowicz Zabrzeziński, Jan Jurejewicz Zabrzeziński, Juliusz Słowacki, Witold Pilecki, Andrzej Bobola, Józef Czapski, Karol Hutten-Czapski, Emeryk Hutten-Czapski, Agenor Romuald Gołuchowski, Spytek I Jarosławski, Jan Chrucki, Henryk Dobrzański, Kazimierz Antoni Wodzicki, Michael Bisping

There are also: Lipka Tatar families of Aksan, Aksanow, Adamowicz, Abramowicz, Musicz, Illasiewicz and Smolski. Zaporozhian Cossack families of Hłasko (Hlaska). Hungarian families of Urak and Czobor. Circassian families of Szymkowicz and Temruk. French families of de Virion and de Spiner. German, Prussian families of Morstyn, Beyer, Brandt, Bolte, Przywidzki, Damerau, Kappel, Lipen. Flemish family of Bremer and Dutch/Netherlands families of De Kunder/Kunter/Kunther. Moldavian family Brăescu.

Gallery
Drawings of Leliwa during the ages

Paintings

Standard variations

Standard variations from ennoblements

Standard variations (considered as Leliwa variations only by single heraldists)

Aristocratic variations

Families from Kashubia
In Croatian and Illyrian heraldry

See also
 Polish heraldry
 Heraldic family
 List of Polish nobility coats of arms

Bibliography
 Bartosz Paprocki: Herby rycerstwa polskiego na pięcioro ksiąg rozdzielone, Kraków, 1584.
 Tadeusz Gajl: Herbarz polski od średniowiecza do XX wieku : ponad 4500 herbów szlacheckich 37 tysięcy nazwisk 55 tysięcy rodów. L&L, 2007. .
 Alfred Znamierowski: Herbarz rodowy. Warszawa: Świat Książki, 2004. .
 Jan Długosz: Liber Beneficiorum. T. I,II.
 Włodzimierz Dworzaczek: Leliwici Tarnowscy. Instytut Wydawniczy PAX, 1971. .
 Sławomir Górzyński: Herby szlachty polskiej. Warszawa: Wydawnictwa Uniwersytetu Warszawskiego i Wydawnictwo ALFA, 1990. .
 Szymon Okolski: Orbis Poloni.. T. 2. Kraków: 1641–1643.
 Juliusz Karol Ostrowski: Księga herbowa rodów polskich. T. 1–2. Warszawa: Główny skład księgarnia antykwarska B. Bolcewicza, 1897.
 Franciszek Piekosiński: Heraldyka polska wieków średnich. Kraków: Akademia Umiejętności, 1899.
 Hipolit Stupnicki: Herbarz polski Kaspra Niesieckiego. T. 6. Lipsk: Breitkopf i Haertl, 1841.
 Alfred Znamierowski: Herbarz rodowy. Warszawa: Świat Książki, 2004. .
 Oleg Odnorozhenko, Rodova heral''dyka Ruso-Vlaxiyi (Moldav''skoho hospodarstva) kincya XIV-XVI st., Harkiv, 2008, p. 65.
 Album paléographique moldave. Documents du XIVe, XVe et XVIe siècle. Recueillis par Jean Bogdan et publiés avec une instruction et des résumés par N. Iorga. Album paleografic moldovenesc. Documente din secolele al XIV-lea, al XV-lea şi al XVI-lea. Adunate de Ioan Bogdan şi publicate cu o introducere şi resumate de N. Iorga, Bucarest/București – Paris, 1926, planşa 98 (imagini în anexă).

References

Leliwa